Klondike is a 2022 Ukrainian drama film written, directed, and edited by Maryna Er Gorbach. The film stars Oxana Cherkashyna as a pregnant woman living near the Ukrainian-Russian border during the Russo-Ukrainian War and the shooting of Malaysia Airlines Flight 17. Klondike premiered at the Sundance Film Festival on January 21, 2022, where it won the World Cinema Dramatic Competition for directing. At the Berlin International Film Festival, it won the second place in Panorama Audience Award category.This film was selected as the Ukrainian entry for the Best International Feature Film at the 95th Academy Awards.

Cast
 Oksana Cherkashina as Irka
 Serhiy Shadrin as Tolik
 Oleg Shcherbina as Yurik, Irka's younger brother

Film crew 
 Director — Maryna Er Gorbach
 Screenwriter — Maryna Er Gorbach
 Cinematographer — Sviatoslav Bulakovsky
 Art Directors — Maria Denisenko, Vitaly Sudarkov, Andrew Grechishkin
 Composer — Zviad Mgebrishvili
 Sound director — Sergeant Kurpiel
 Costume designer — Victoria Filipova
 Makeup artist — Ksenia Galchenko
 Producers — Maryna Er Gorbach, Svyatoslav Bulakovsky, Mehmet Bahadir Er

Plot 
The film focuses on the story of a local Ukrainian family trapped at the epicenter of the crash of MH17. The actions unfold on July 17, 2014, in the village of Grabove, Donetsk region, near the Russian border. The protagonists Irina and Anatoly are expecting their first child, as the war brutally invades their lives, along with the wreckage of a downed Boeing. The woman refuses to evacuate, even when armed groups occupy the village.

Film production 
The film project won the 11th State Cinema Competition held by Ukrainian State Film Agency. Additionally, in May 2021, the Ministry of Culture and Tourism of Turkey supported film production. The budget accounted for UAH 25.9 million. The casting was guided by Tanya Simon. Bosnian sound director Serjan Kurpiel and Georgian composer Zviad Mgebrishvili were also involved in the project. Under the terms of cooperation, 90% of post-production took place in Turkey.

Awards and nominations

See also
 List of submissions to the 95th Academy Awards for Best International Feature Film
 List of Ukrainian submissions for the Academy Award for Best International Feature Film

References

External links 
 

2022 films
Ukrainian drama films
Sundance Film Festival award winners
2022 drama films
War in Donbas films
Ukrainian-language films